Isatou "Satou" Sabally (born 25 April 1998) is a German-American  professional basketball player for the Dallas Wings of the Women's National Basketball Association (WNBA) and Fenerbahçe of the Turkish Super League (KBSL). She played college basketball for the Oregon Ducks. Despite having one remaining season of college eligibility, Sabally announced in February 2020 that she would enter the 2020 WNBA draft; she was draft-eligible because she reached the league's minimum age of 22 shortly after the April draft.

Early life 
Sabally was born in New York City to a Gambian father and German mother. Her given name of Isatou is that of her father's sister; according to Sabally, the name is derived from that of Aisha, one of the wives of Islamic prophet Muhammad. While Gambian tradition normally calls for a family's oldest daughter to receive an aunt's name, she was so named despite not being the oldest daughter.  The family moved to Gambia when she was 2 years old, and then moved to Berlin when she was preparing to start school. She was discovered by a local coach as a 9-year-old at a playground and began regularly attending practices. She was the only girl on her first youth team.

College career

2017–18
During her first year at Oregon, Sabally appeared in every game for the Ducks while averaging 10.7 points and 3.8 rebounds per game. She was named to the Pac-12 all-Freshman team and  Pac-12 Freshman of the Year.

2018–19
In her second season, Sabally started all 38 games and was the third most efficient player in NCAA. Following the season, she was named to the Pac-12 team, an honorable mention All-American by the WBCA, and to the watchlist for both the Naismith Trophy and Wade Trophy.

Professional career

WNBA 
In her rookie season, Sabally was named to the 2020 AP All-Rookie team. In her second season she was named to the 2021 WNBA All-Star Game

Overseas 
She signed with Fenerbahçe for the 2020–21 season. After the undefeated championship in the Turkish Super League and finishing third in the EuroLeague, she extended her contract with Fenerbahçe for one more year.

WNBA career statistics

Regular season 

|-
| style="text-align:left;"| 2020
| style="text-align:left;"| Dallas
| 16 || 14 || 28.1 || .368 || .197 || .872 || 7.8 || 2.5 || 0.9 || 0.9 || 2.2 || 13.9
|-
| style="text-align:left;"| 2021
| style="text-align:left;"| Dallas
| 17 || 14 || 24.9 || .418 || .327 || .770 || 5.9 || 2.8 || 0.2 || 0.8 || 2.3 || 11.9
|-
| style="text-align:left;"| 2022
| style="text-align:left;"| Dallas
| 11 || 6 || 21.7 || .398 || .233 || .914 || 4.8 || 2.1 || 0.5 || 0.2 || 2.3 || 11.3
|-
| style="text-align:left;"| Career
| style="text-align:left;"| 3 years, 1 team
| 44 || 34 || 25.3 || .393 || .250 || .846 || 6.3 || 2.5 || 0.5 || 0.7 || 2.3 || 12.5

Playoffs

|-
| style="text-align:left;"| 2021
| style="text-align:left;"| Dallas
| 1 || 0 || 22.0 || .500 || – || .667 || 4.0 || 1.0 || 2.0 || 1.0 || 2.0 || 12.0
|-
| style="text-align:left;"| 2022
| style="text-align:left;"| Dallas
| 3 || 0 || 15.3 || .333 || .300 || .800 || 1.3 || 3.0 || 0.0 || 0.3 || 0.7 || 7.0
|-
| style="text-align:left;"| Career
| style="text-align:left;"| 2 years, 1 team
| 4 || 0 || 17.0 || .387 || .300 || .750 || 2.0 || 2.5 || 0.5 || 0.5 || 1.0 || 8.3

National team
Sabally played for the Germany women's national 3x3 team at the 2019 European Games in Minsk.

Personal life and activism
According to Kelly Graves, Sabally's head coach at Oregon, she was more determined to make a difference in the world than anyone else he had coached. A Muslim, she considers Muhammad Ali to be one of her greatest inspirations. In her sophomore season at Oregon, she was one of the Pac-12's two representatives to the NCAA 2019 Leadership forum, and in her rookie WNBA season in 2020, became the only rookie to serve in a leadership role on the WNBA Social Justice Council. According to Sports Illustrated writer Erica Ayala, "her experience being biracial on three continents was a boon for the U.S.-based council hoping to speak about global racism." She completed work for a bachelor's degree in social science with a minor in legal studies in August 2020, graduating in three years with honors.

Sabally has also become a partner with UNICEF, and is set to become one of several WNBA players to sign endorsement deals with the beauty brand Alaffia, a company that follows a social enterprise model and provides work for over 12,000 women in another West African country, Togo.

Satou's sister, Nyara, was drafted fifth overall by the New York Liberty in the 2022 WNBA draft.

Footnotes

References

1998 births
Living people
All-American college women's basketball players
Basketball players at the 2019 European Games
Basketball players from Berlin
Basketball players from New York City
Dallas Wings draft picks
Dallas Wings players
European Games competitors for Germany
Fenerbahçe women's basketball players
German expatriate basketball people in Turkey
German Muslims
German people of Gambian descent
German sportspeople of African descent
German women's basketball players
Oregon Ducks women's basketball players
Small forwards
Women's National Basketball Association All-Stars